Bhupalam (pronounced bhūpalam) is a rāgam in Carnatic music (musical scale of South Indian classical music). It is a pentatonic scale (audava rāgam or owdava rāgam). It is a janya rāgam (derived scale), as it does not have all the seven swaras (musical notes). It is also written as Bhoopalam.

It is considered an auspicious scale and a morning rāgam. In Tamil music, this scale is called Puranirmai pann and some thevarams are set to this scale. This rāgam is played in the night. It is also used for chanting slokas, folks songs, Kathakali music and other rituals. The equivalent scale in Hindustani music is Bhupal Todi.

Structure and Lakshana 

Bhupalam is a symmetric rāgam that does not contain madhyamam or nishādham. It is a symmetric pentatonic scale (audava-audava ragam in Carnatic music classification – audava meaning 'of 5'). Its ascending and descending scale ( structure) is as follows:

 : 
 : 

The notes used in this scale are shadjam, shuddha rishabham, sadharna gandharam, panchamam and shuddha dhaivatham, as per Carnatic music notation and terms for the swaras. Bhupalam is considered a janya rāgam of Shubhapantuvarali, the 45th Melakarta rāgam, though it can be derived from 5 other melakarta rāgams by dropping both the madhyamam and nishādham.

Popular compositions 
Bhupalam rāgam lends itself for good elaboration and has a few compositions in both classical music and film music. Here are some popular songs composed in Bhupalam.

Sadhu vibhatam (varnam) and other kritis, Nijadasanam prati and Samajendra composed by Swati Tirunal
Annai Janaki by Arunachala Kavi
Sadachaleshwaram by Muthuswami Dikshitar

Film Songs

Language:Tamil

Related rāgams 
This section covers the theoretical and scientific aspect of this rāgam.

Graha bhedham 
Bhupalam's notes when shifted using Graha bhedham, yields two pentatonic rāgams, Gambhiranata and Hamsanadam. Graha bhedham is the step taken in keeping the relative note frequencies same, while shifting the shadjam to the next note in the rāgam. We get Hamsanadam by shifting the Shadjam to Shuddha Rishabham. For more details and illustrations of this concept refer Graha bhedham on Gambhiranata.

Scale similarities 
Revagupti rāgam differs from Bhupalam only by the gāndhāram. It uses antara gāndhāram instead of sadharana gāndhāram and its  structure is S R1 G3 P D1 S : S D1 P G3 R1 S
Bhauli rāgam uses an additional nishadam in descending scale, in comparison to Revagupti above. Its  structure is S R1 G3 P D1 S : S N3 D1 P G3 R1 S
Karnataka Shuddha Saveri rāgam uses shuddha madhyamam in place of sadharana gandharam of Bhupalam. Its  structure is S R1 M1 P D1 S : S D1 P M1 R1 S

Notes

References 

Janya ragas